Persons who are not Chinese citizens but are distinguished in their scientific or engineering work are recognized by the Chinese Academy of Sciences (CAS) through election as a foreign member. 

Recently elected foreign members of the CAS include:

References